The 2016 New Progressive Party primaries was the primary elections by which voters of the New Progressive Party (PNP) chose its nominees for various political offices of Puerto Rico for the 2016 general elections. They were held on June 5, 2016 and also coincided with the Democratic Party primaries in the island.

Candidates

Governor

 Pedro Pierluisi, incumbent Resident Commissioner of Puerto Rico
 Ricky Rosselló, scientist and political activist, son of former Governor of Puerto Rico Pedro Rosselló

Resident Commissioner

 Jenniffer González, incumbent member and former Speaker of the House of Representatives of Puerto Rico
 Carlos Pesquera, former Secretary of the Puerto Rico Department of Transportation and Public Works and gubernatorial candidate

Senate

At-large

 Frankie Amador
 Alba Iris Calderón
 Iván Díaz Carrasquillo
 Ramón Díaz
 Javier García Cabán
 Zoé Laboy
 Abel Nazario
 Margarita Nolasco Santiago

 Itzamar Peña
 Eric "Javo" Ramírez
 Mario Ramos Méndez
 Thomas Rivera Schatz
 María Salgado Sánchez
 Larry Seilhamer
 José Chemo Soto
 Johanne Vélez

House of Representatives

At-large

Néstor Alonso
José Aponte
Jorge Emmanuel Báez
María Milagros Charbonier
Joe Colón
José Enrique Meléndez

José Olmos Muñíz
Lourdes Ramos
Roberto Rivera
Hiram Torres Montalvo
José "Pichy" Torres Zamora
Jesús Vélez

Results

The primaries were held on June 5, 2016. In it, newcomer Ricky Rosselló narrowly defeated incumbent Resident Commissioner Pedro Pierluisi to win the spot for Governor at the 2016 elections. Also, Jenniffer González comfortably defeated Carlos Pesquera with 71% of the votes to win the spot for Resident Commissioner.

Governor

Resident Commissioner

Senate

At-large

House of Representatives

At-large

See also

Popular Democratic Party of Puerto Rico primaries, 2016

References

External links
Comisión Estatal de Elecciones

Primary elections in Puerto Rico
PNP
New Progressive Party (Puerto Rico)